A crossover dribble is a basketball manoeuvre in which a player dribbling the ball switches the ball rapidly from one hand to the other, to make a change in direction. In a typical example the player heads up-court, dribbling the ball in (say) the left hand, then makes a wide step left with a good head fake. If the defender is deceived, the player can then switch to dribbling with the right hand and surpass the defender. The crossover can allow the player an open short jumper or a clear path to the basket. Crossover is generally performed for space creation. 

The following are a few types of crossovers:
 Normal crossover: In a normal crossover, the player quickly changes direction while switching the ball to the opposite hand. This move relies primarily on speed. Basketball analysts have cited Derrick Rose and Russell Westbrook to be perfectionists at this certain crossover. In this crossover there isn't a big fake, instead you simply move one direction, and use the crossover to make an abrupt change of direction.
 Between the legs crossover: The ball handler dribbles the ball between the legs from one hand to the other.
 "In and Out": This move has the ball handler feint a crossover in one direction then continue towards his original direction. A variation of this move may include the player doing a normal crossover after a hesitation to cause further difficulty for the defensive player.
 Killer crossover (aka Ankle-snatcher, Ankle-breaker, etc): In this move the player fakes in one direction, generally with a wide step and a head fake and usually from a standstill. The player then switches the dribble to the other hand between his/her legs and moves in that direction. This is one of the most effective methods of escaping a defender who is guarding closely. It is also popular in streetball because it can cause the defender to lose balance and fall in trying to react too quickly. Tim Hardaway was known for his version of this move calling it the "UTEP Two-step". He would go between the legs and fake one direction, then quickly change directions with a crossover. 
 Behind the back crossover: In a behind the back crossover, the player dribbles the ball from one hand to the other behind the back (in contrast to the normal crossover in which the ball is dribbled to the front). Another version of this move is called the "wraparound," in which the player cups the ball in his hand and brings it around his back to the other side of his body in one quick, smooth motion.  Jamal Crawford is known for this move.
 Double crossover: This move can be considered a feigned crossover. The offensive player crosses the ball over (as with a normal or killer crossover) then quickly crosses the ball back to its original position. The double crossover is not aimed at breaking free of the defender so much as causing confusion and breaking the defender's balance. This move can also be replicated going between the legs or behind the back. Allen Iverson popularized this move in the early 2000s.
 Shammgod: A type of crossover dribble where the offensive player bounces the ball forward to a very risky position on one side of his body, then uses the opposite hand to bring the ball back to the other side of his body. Named after college and NBA player (and current Dallas Mavericks player development coach) God Shammgod. Known users of this move include Chris Paul, Kobe Bryant, Kyrie Irving, and Jamal Crawford in the NBA; and in international basketball, Dejan Bodiroga of Serbia and Terrence Romeo of the Philippines.

The original crossover move has been used by all five positions on the court, but particularly by point and shooting guards. The first crossover was seen in a street basketball game at the Rucker Park by the street legend Richard (Rick) "Pee Wee" Kirkland. Oscar Robertson was known to do the move as early as the 1960s as well as Dwayne Washington while playing for Syracuse during the early 1980s, but Tim Hardaway is credited for popularizing the killer crossover in the NBA, while Allen Iverson and Steve Francis popularized the double crossover.

References

External links
 Allen Iverson Crossover on Streetball.com
 Killer crossover explained on Basketball Performance
 5 Crossover Moves You MUST Master! by Get Handles Basketball
 

Basketball terminology